Bristol Eye Hospital is a specialist ophthalmic hospital in Bristol. It is part of the University Hospitals Bristol and Weston NHS Foundation Trust.
The University of Bristol Dental Hospital is adjacent, and the Bristol Royal Infirmary is nearby.

History
The hospital was founded in 1808 by Dr William Henry Goldwyer as "The Institution for the Cure of Disease of the Eye Amongst the Poor" in Lower Maudlin Street. In 1839, and again in 1898, it expanded into adjoining buildings. In 1935 a new building was completed, which was in turn replaced in 1982 creating the present hospital which opened in 1986. A refurbishment and expansion took place between 2010 and 2011.

References

External links

University Hospitals Bristol and Weston NHS Foundation Trust
NHS hospitals in England
Hospitals in Bristol
Specialist hospitals in England
Eye hospitals in the United Kingdom